The Ošupis is a stream in the west of Lithuania in the municipality Palanga in Klaipėda County in Samogitia.

It begins in Kontininkai (in the district of Palanga). It flows at first to the north then from the village Užkanavė to the west and afterward joins the stream Kaniavosis and flows into the Baltic Sea near Užkanavė (north of Palanga).

Etymology 
Ošupis is composed from the Lithuanian words ošti meaning "foam" and upė meaning "river".

References 

Rivers of Lithuania